EIAO or E.I.A.O. may refer to:

 European Internet Accessibility Observatory, an organization assessing Internet accessibility
 European Interparliamentary Assembly on Orthodoxy, a transnational organization of orthodox parliamentarians

 See also
 Eiao, a formerly populated island in French Polynesia